Lunger is a surname. Notable people with the surname include:

 Arnold Lunger (20th century), Italian luger
 Brett Lunger (born 1945), American racecar driver
 Hansjörg Lunger (born 1964), Italian ski mountaineer
 Jane du Pont Lunger (1914–2001), American heiress
 Tamara Lunger (born 1986), Italian ski mountaineer